A shared lane marking, shared-lane marking, or sharrow is a street marking installed at various locations worldwide, such as New Zealand, Australia, Canada, Spain, and the United States. This marking is placed in the travel lane to indicate where people should preferably cycle.

History
These markings are used in the USA, Australia, and other countries. In US usage, the wide shape of the arrow, combined with the bike symbol, gave rise to unofficial names such as "bike in a house" or "sharrow". In the UK roughly the same function is served by a bicycle symbol without arrows. However, this tends to be used more as an indication of a formal cycle route rather than as an encouragement to share the road.

The original "bike in a house" or "man jumping barrels at home" marking was developed by James Mackay and included in the 1993 Denver Bicycle Master Plan.  While Mackay had considered a "connect the dots" pavement markings approach for bicycle route definition and cyclist lane positioning reinforcement (during his time as the Bicycle Facilities Engineer for the North Carolina Department of Transportation), the City of Denver's unwillingness to commit to bike lane markings meant that shared lane markings were the only pavement marking treatment for bicyclists that the City would implement. The hollow arrow surrounding the cyclist was intended to reinforce the correct direction of travel for bicyclists (who were frequently observed riding the wrong way, against traffic, in Denver).

In 2004, the city of San Francisco, California began experimenting with the shared lane marking, and developed a revised symbol consisting of a bicycle symbol with two chevron markings above the bicycle. In the process, the name sharrow was coined by Oliver Gajda, of the City and County of San Francisco Bicycle Program, and is a portmanteau of share and arrow.

In a 2009 paper, Northeastern University researcher Peter G. Furth proposed the "Bicycle Priority Lane", which combines sharrows with dotted lines inside the usual lane markings. This marks a five-foot-wide zone in the center of the lane which bicyclists are encouraged to use. The city of Boston, Massachusetts began experimenting with these markings in 2013.

Effectiveness

Behavioral studies prepared for the Federal Highway Administration and the city of San Francisco have shown that streets with shared lane arrows increase separation between motor vehicles and cyclists, encourage cyclists to ride outside of the door zone, and may reduce wrong way cycling and sidewalk cycling, which are associated with increased crash risk.

However, another study published in the journal Injury Prevention based on hospital records shows no statistically significant reduction in injuries, and possibly a small increase.

A 2016 study commissioned by the Transportation Research Board conducted a comprehensive longitudinal analysis of census block groups in Chicago. Block groups were categorized in one of 3 categories: block groups with bike lanes installed, block groups with sharrows only, and block groups with no cycling infrastructure. The authors found that blocks with bike lanes experienced a significantly larger increase in bicycle commuters than block groups with sharrows, which were only a bit better than those without infrastructure. Block groups with only sharrows installed were significantly less effective at reducing injuries per year per commuter than both block groups with bike lanes and even as block groups with no infrastructure. The study concludes that these findings raise concerns on the effectiveness of sharrows as a safety measure and as an incentive to bicycle commuting.
In the discussion on this study it was criticized that block groups were compared instead of streets.

Usage

North America
The US Manual on Uniform Traffic Control Devices says shared-lane markings may be used to:

Based on the San Francisco experimental data, in August 2004 the California Traffic Control Devices Committee (CTCDC) approved the use of this marking in California.  In the 2009 edition of the Manual on Uniform Traffic Control Devices, shared lane markings were approved for general use. The city of Seattle, Washington included extensive use of shared lane markings in its Bicycle Master Plan of early 2007. The concept has since been implemented by cities throughout the United States.

Shared lane marking has been adopted in Canada, being used in localities ranging from Montreal to Vancouver.

Worldwide

For several years, the traffic rules of France have allowed shared lanes, there called voies partagées, in addition to two types of dedicated bike lanes. One of those is obligatory, the other one is not obligatory, but also reserved for bicycles. All have the same pictograms on the street surface, but are distinguished by roadside signs.

In the Czech Republic, a series of sharrows on shared lanes are called Cyklopiktokoridor which translates as "cycle pictogram corridors". For cycle lanes with marked limits, a strict type and a soft type exist (as in France), and are distinguished by different pictograms.

The concept of shared lane markings has also appeared in Spain  and New Zealand.

In Germany, the concept is not yet established officially, but some local authorities use simple bike logos for the same purpose, without having a specific term for them.

In Latvia, a single street in its capital Riga has markings indicating the lanes as "recommended cycle lanes", however legally this marking is not defined and consequently there are no differences to any other road with shared traffic.

See also
 Bicycle boulevard
 Complete streets
 Cycling infrastructure
 Lane splitting
 Shared space

Notes

References

External links

 Manual on Uniform Traffic Control Devices (MUTCD), 2009 Edition: Chapter 9C. Markings, see last section!
 "Four Solid Uses for Sharrows"
 NCUTCD webpage on shared-lane marking
FAQ on shared lane markings created by Bike Pittsburgh and the Pittsburgh Dept. of City Planning
 Thunder Bay (Ontario): Informations for motorists and cyclists on shared lanes and bike lanes''

Cycling infrastructure
Transportation in the United States
Road infrastructure
Cycling safety
Transport in Canada
Transport in Australia